Vasile Toloconnicov (born 12 March 1974) is a retired Moldovan footballer who played as a defender.

References

1974 births
Living people
Moldovan footballers
FC Zimbru Chișinău players
FC Nistru Otaci players
Association football defenders
Moldova international footballers